Actin-like protein 6B is a protein that in humans is encoded by the ACTL6B gene.

Function 

The protein encoded by this gene is a member of a family of actin-related proteins (ARPs) which share significant amino acid sequence identity to conventional actins. Both actins and ARPs have an actin fold, which is an ATP-binding cleft, as a common feature. The ARPs are involved in diverse cellular processes, including vesicular transport, spindle orientation, nuclear migration and chromatin remodeling. This gene encodes a subunit of the BAF (BRG1/brm-associated factor) complex in mammals, which is functionally related to SWI/SNF complex in S. cerevisiae and Drosophila; the latter is thought to facilitate transcriptional activation of specific genes by antagonizing chromatin-mediated transcriptional repression. This subunit may be involved in the regulation of genes by structural modulation of their chromatin, specifically in the brain.

Interactions 

ACTL6B has been shown to interact with CTBP1.

References

External links

Further reading 

 
 
 
 
 
 

Human proteins